W. Allan Smith is a former football (soccer) player who represented New Zealand at international level.

Smith played two official A-international matches for the New Zealand in 1954, both 1-4 losses against trans-Tasman neighbours Australia, the first on 4 September in which Smith scoring New Zealand's goal, the second on 9 September, Charlie Steele, Jr. the scorer on that occasion.

References 

Year of birth missing
Possibly living people
New Zealand association footballers
New Zealand international footballers
20th-century New Zealand people
Association football forwards